Rebecca Soumeru (born 22 December 1981) is a Dutch softball player who represents the Netherlands women's national softball team in international competitions.

Soumeru played for Run '71 Oldenzaal, Macerata and since 2007 for Sparks Haarlem. She is a pitcher who bats left-handed and who throws right-handed. She competes for the Dutch national team since 2001. In 2002 and 2005 she was named the best pitcher of the Dutch softball Hoofdklasse; in 2004 she was the MVP of the league. She was part of the Dutch team for the 2008 Summer Olympics.

References

External links
 
 Soumeru at dutchsoftballteam.com

Living people
1981 births
Dutch softball players
Olympic softball players of the Netherlands
Softball players at the 2008 Summer Olympics
People from Höxter (district)
Sportspeople from Detmold (region)